Franklin D'Olier Reeve (September 18, 1928 – June 28, 2013) was an American academic, writer, poet, Russian translator, and editor. He was also the father of Superman actor Christopher Reeve. He was the grandson of the first American Legion national commander, Franklin D'Olier.

Life and career
Reeve was born in Philadelphia, the son of Anne Conrad D'Olier and Richard Henry Reeve. He was brought up outside New York City. Reeve worked in the wheat fields for a while during college and, after graduation, was a Hudson River longshoreman for a while.  He graduated from Princeton University (1950) and Columbia University (1958), and in 1961 was one of the first exchanges between the American Council of Learned Societies and the USSR Academy of Sciences. In the late summer of 1962 he accompanied Robert Frost to Russia for his meeting with Nikita Khrushchev, where Reeve served as Frost's translator.

Reeve started his academic career teaching Russian language and literature at Columbia University.  After teaching at Columbia, Reeve moved to Wesleyan University in 1962 as chairman of the Russian Department.  In 1967, he joined Wesleyan's inter-disciplinary College of Letters where he taught literature, humanities and creative writing until his retirement in 2002.  During the course of his career he had visiting appointments at Oxford University, Yale, and Columbia.

From 1994 on, he lived in Wilmington, Vermont with his wife, novelist Laura Stevenson.  Reeve was an officer of the Poetry Society of America, the founding editor of Poetry Review, the secretary of Poets House in its formative years, and was associated with the New England Poetry Club and the New York Quarterly.  He published over two dozen books of poetry, fiction, criticism, and translation.

Reeve died on June 28, 2013, at Dartmouth Hitchcock Hospital in Lebanon, New Hampshire from complications from diabetes.

Awards
 New England Poetry Club's Golden Rose Award
 Award in literature from the American Academy National Institute of Arts and Letters
 Lit.D. from New England College

Works

Poetry

Fiction

Criticism

Translations
 
 
 
 
  (Revision and edit of Leo Wiener translation.)

Oratorio
 "The Urban Stampede", with music by Andrew Gant, Barbican Centre, London, 2000

References

External links
 "Interview with F. D. Reeve", Cervena Barva Press
 "Interview with The New York Quarterly", New Hampshire Public Radio
 Author's website
 

1928 births
2013 deaths
American male poets
Columbia University alumni
Columbia University faculty
Deaths from diabetes
New England College alumni
Writers from Philadelphia
People from Grafton County, New Hampshire
Princeton University alumni
American publishers (people)
Wesleyan University faculty
20th-century American poets
20th-century American male writers
Winthrop family